Friday is a surname. Notable people with the surname include:

 David Friday (1876-1945), American educator
 Elmer Otto Friday (1924-2006), American judge and politician 
 Fred Friday, Nigerian footballer
 Gavin Friday (born 1959), Irish singer, composer and painter
 Hershel Friday (1922-1994), American lawyer
 Mike Friday (born 1972), English rugby player and coach
 Nancy Friday (1933–2017), American author 
 Pat Friday (1921–2016), American singer 
 Robin Friday (1952–1990), English footballer
 Tim Friday (born 1961), American ice hockey player
 William C. Friday (1920-2012), American educator

For the Arapaho interpreter and negotiator, see Friday (Arapaho chief)